Hypotia mimicralis is a species of snout moth in the genus Hypotia. It was described by Hans Georg Amsel in 1951 and is known from the United Arab Emirates and Iran.

References
Original Publication: Amsel, H.G. 1951, Die Microlepidopteren der Brandt'schen Iran-Ausbeute 3. Teil. - Arkiv för Zoologi Band 1 nr. 36, Almqvist & Wiksells Boktryckeri AB, Uppsala. pp. 525–563 Mit 87 Figuren im Text.

External links
Swedish Museum of Natural History. Images of the type

Moths described in 1951
Hypotiini